Pontiac High School (PHS) is a public high school in Pontiac, Michigan. It was formed and reestablished in 2009 from the consolidation of Pontiac Central High School and Pontiac Northern High School. Pontiac High School occupies the former Pontiac Northern High School building. The name “Phoenix” is the name of Pontiac High School that has risen from the ashes.

History
Pontiac High School was established in 1849.  When Pontiac Northern High School was established in 1958, Pontiac High School was renamed Pontiac Central High School.

In 2009, Pontiac Central High School and Pontiac Northern High School consolidated and Pontiac High School was reestablished. Pontiac High School occupies the former Pontiac Northern High School building.

The name of Pontiac High School's athletic teams is the Phoenix to signify Pontiac High as a new school, risen from the ashes, as in the legend of the Phoenix.

The nonprofit organization Great Lakes Education Project suggested in 2013 that Pontiac High be closed. By 2017 the Michigan State School Reform Office considered closing the school; in response parents, school district employees, and others in the area attended a rally protesting against the movement to close the school.

References

External links
 

High schools in Oakland County, Michigan
Schools in Pontiac, Michigan
Public high schools in Michigan